The Wilson Motor Company, at 42 Cortez Kennedy Ave. in Wilson, Arkansas, was listed on the National Register of Historic Places in 2019.

The building was an automobile dealership and filling station, built around 1930.  It is unusual for its Tudor Revival style.

References

Gas stations on the National Register of Historic Places in Arkansas
National Register of Historic Places in Mississippi County, Arkansas
Commercial buildings completed in 1930
Transportation in Mississippi County, Arkansas
1930 establishments in Arkansas
Tudor Revival architecture in Arkansas
Wilson, Arkansas